Hryhorij Lakota, also known as Gregor Lakota (Hryhorij being the Ukrainian spelling for the Russian Grigoriy and the anglicised Gregor, 31 January 1883 – 12 November 1950) was a Ukrainian Greek-Catholic Church auxiliary bishop who suffered religious persecution and was martyred by the Soviet Government.

He was beatified by Pope John Paul II on 27 June 2001 in Ukraine.

Biography 
Hryhorij Lakota was born 31 January 1883 in Holodivka, in Austrian Galicia, Lviv region. 

He studied theology in Lviv. He was ordained to the priesthood in 1908. In 1911, he later received his Ph. D. in Theology in Vienna. He was appointed auxiliary bishop of Przemyśl on 16 May 1926. 

On 9 June 1946, he was arrested by the NKVD and sentenced to ten years imprisonment, as part of Joseph Stalin's suppression of the Ukrainian Greek-Catholic (Uniate) church. In exile in Vorkuta (Russia), he was recognized for his humaneness and humility as he took on unbearable conditions to make life easier for others. Father Alfonsas Svarinskas recounts Bishop Hryhorij's behavior in camp as reflecting "Christian virtues." 

He died at the Abez labour camp, near Vorkuta on 12 November 1950.

In popular media 
Lakota and another Ukrainian Catholic Bishop, Josyf Slipyj, became the inspiration for the character of Kiril Pavlovich Lakota in the novel The Shoes of the Fisherman, which was later made into a film.

References

1883 births
1950 deaths
People from Lviv Oblast
People from the Kingdom of Galicia and Lodomeria
Ukrainian Austro-Hungarians
20th-century Eastern Catholic martyrs
Polish beatified people
Soviet religious leaders
Bishops of the Ukrainian Greek Catholic Church
Polish deportees to Soviet Union
Polish people who died in Soviet detention
Polish people detained by the NKVD
Beatifications by Pope John Paul II